Linguistics is a field of study.

Linguistics may also refer to these publications:
Linguistics (journal), a bimonthly De Gruyter periodical (1963 onwards)
Linguistics: A Very Short Introduction, a 2003 OUP concise guide
 Linguistics: An Introduction to Language and Communication, an MIT Press textbook (1979 onwards)